Sydenham Damerel, previously South Sydenham, is a village, parish and former manor in Devon, situated 4 miles north-west of Tavistock.

The village lies 1 mile east of the River Tamar which forms the border of Devon with Cornwall, and which also forms the parish boundary. The river is crossed by the listed medieval Horse Bridge, near the hamlet of Horsebridge. The parish church is dedicated to St Mary.

References

External links

Local government

Villages in Devon